Whitesboro may refer to:

 Whitesboro, California
 Whitesboro, New Jersey
 Whitesboro, New York
 Whitesboro, Oklahoma
 Whitesboro, Texas